Caldicoprobacter is a genus of bacteria from the family of Caldicoprobacteraceae.

References

Further reading 
 
 
 

 

Eubacteriales
Bacteria genera
Bacillota